1 Esdras, also Esdras A, Greek Esdras, Greek Ezra, or 3 Esdras, is the ancient Greek Septuagint version of the biblical Book of Ezra in use within the early church, and among many modern Christians with varying degrees of canonicity. 1 Esdras is substantially similar to the standard Hebrew version of Ezra–Nehemiah, with the passages specific to the career of Nehemiah removed or re-attributed to Ezra, and some additional material.

As part of the Septuagint translation, it is now regarded as canonical in the churches of the East, but apocryphal in the West; either presented in a separate section, or excluded altogether. 1 Esdras is found in Origen's Hexapla. The  Greek Septuagint, the  Old Latin bible and related bible versions include both Esdras Αʹ (English title: 1 Esdras) and Esdras Βʹ (Ezra–Nehemiah) as separate books.

There is scope for considerable confusion with references to 1 Esdras. The name refers primarily to translations of the original Greek 'Esdras A'. The Septuagint calls it Esdras A, while the Vulgate calls it 3 Esdras. It was considered apocryphal by Jerome. The Vulgate book of Ezra, translated from the Hebrew was, from the 8th century onwards, occasionally split into two books, which were then denoted 1 Esdras (Ezra) and 2 Esdras (Nehemiah) respectively. Vulgate Bible editions of the 13th century, and in what later became the usage of the Clementine Vulgate and the Anglican Articles of Religion, '1 Esdras' is applied to the Book of Ezra; while the Book of Nehemiah corresponds to '2 Esdras'. Septuagint version Esdras A is called in the Clementine Vulgate 3 Esdras. The 'Apocalypse of Ezra', an additional work associated with the name Ezra, is denoted '4 Esdras' in the Clementine Vulgate and  the Articles of Religion, but called '2 Esdras' in the King James Version and in most modern English bibles. 3 Esdras continues to be accepted as canonical by Eastern Orthodoxy and the Ethiopian Orthodox Tewahedo Church, with 4 Esdras varying in canonicity between particular denominations within the Eastern churches.

Overwhelmingly, citations in early Christian writings claimed from the scriptural 'Book of Ezra' (without any qualification) are taken from 1 Esdras, and never from the 'Ezra' sections of Ezra–Nehemiah (Septuagint 'Esdras B'), the majority of early citations being taken from the 1 Esdras section containing the 'Tale of the Three Guardsmen', which is interpreted as Christological prophecy.

Contents 

1 Esdras contains the whole of Ezra with the addition of one section; its verses are numbered differently. Just as Ezra begins with the last two verses of 2 Chronicles, 1 Esdras begins with the last two chapters; this suggests that Chronicles and Esdras may have been read as one book at sometime in the past.

Ezra 4:6 includes a reference to a King Ahasuerus. Etymologically, Ahasuerus is the same as Xerxes, who reigned between Darius I and Artaxerxes I. Eighteenth-century expositor John Gill, who deemed the reference to Xerxes out of place, identified Ahasuerus with Cambyses II. Nineteenth-century commentator Adam Clarke identified him with Bardiya, who both reigned before Darius I. In 1 Esdras, the section is reorganized, leading up to the additional section, and the reference to Ahasuerus is removed.

The additional section begins with a story variously known as the 'Darius contest' or 'Tale of the Three Guardsmen' which was interpolated into 1 Esdras 3:4 to 4:4. This section forms the core of 1 Esdras with Ezra 5, which together are arranged in a literary chiasm around the celebration in Jerusalem at the exiles' return. This chiastic core forms 1 Esdras into a complete literary unit, allowing it to stand independently from the book of Nehemiah. Indeed, some scholars, such as W. F. Albright and Edwin M. Yamauchi, believe that Nehemiah came back to Jerusalem before Ezra.

Author and criticism

The purpose of the book seems to be the presentation of the dispute among the courtiers, the 'Tale of the Three Guardsmen', to which details from the other books are added to complete the story. Since there are various discrepancies in the account, most scholars hold that the work was written by more than one author. However, some scholars believe that this work may have been the original, or at least the more authoritative; the variances that are contained in this work are so striking that more research is being conducted. Furthermore, there is  disagreement as to what the original language of the work was, Greek, Aramaic, or Hebrew. Because of similarities to the vocabulary in the Book of Daniel, it is presumed by some that the authors came from Lower Egypt and some or all may have even had a hand in the translation of Daniel. Assuming this theory is correct, many scholars consider the possibility that one chronicler wrote this book.

Josephus makes use of the 1 Esdras which he treats as Scripture, while generally disregarding the canonical text of Ezra–Nehemiah. Some scholars believe that the composition is likely to have taken place in the first century BC or the first century AD. Many Protestant and Catholic scholars assign no historical value to the sections of the book not duplicated in Ezra–Nehemiah. The citations of the other books of the Bible, however, provide an early alternative to the Septuagint for those texts, which increases its value to scholars.

In the current Greek texts, the book breaks off in the middle of a sentence; that particular verse thus had to be reconstructed from an early Latin translation. However, it is generally presumed that the original work extended to the Feast of Tabernacles, as described in Nehemiah 8:13–18. An additional difficulty with the text appears to  readers who are unfamiliar with chiastic structures common in Semitic literature. If the text is assumed to be a Western-style, purely linear narrative, then Artaxerxes seems to be mentioned before Darius, who is mentioned before Cyrus. (Such jumbling of the order of events, however, is also presumed by some readers to exist in the canonical Ezra and Nehemiah.) The Semitic chiasm is corrected in at least one manuscript of Josephus in the Antiquities of the Jews, Book 11, chapter 2 where we find that the name of the above-mentioned Artaxerxes is called Cambyses.

Use in the Christian canon
The book was widely quoted by early Christian authors and it found a place in Origen's Hexapla. According to Jerome, 3 Esdras was considered apocryphal. As Jerome's Vulgate version of the Bible gradually achieved dominance in Western Christianity, 1 Esdras no longer circulated. From the 13th century onwards, Vulgate Bibles produced in Paris reintroduced a Latin text of 1 Esdras, in response to commercial demand. Clement VIII placed it in an appendix to the Vulgate along with 2 Esdras and the Prayer of Manasseh "lest they perish entirely". However, the use of the book continued in the Eastern Church, and it remains a part of the Eastern Orthodox canon.

The Vulgate text of 3 Esdras is a translation from the Greek version of the Septuagint called Esdras A.

In the Roman rite liturgy, the book is cited once in the Extraordinary Missal of 1962 in the Offertory of the votive Mass for the election of a Pope.  ("Let them not take part in the holy things, until there arise a priest unto showing and truth.") (3 Esdras 5, 40).

Some scholars, including Joseph Blenkinsopp in his 1988 commentary on Ezra–Nehemiah, hold that the book is a late 2nd/early 1st century BC revision of Esdras and Esdras β, while others such as L. L. Grabbe believe it to be independent of the Hebrew-language Ezra–Nehemiah.

Nomenclature

The book normally called 1 Esdras is numbered differently among various versions of the Bible. In most editions of the Septuagint, the book is titled in Greek:  and is placed before the single book of Ezra–Nehemiah, which is titled in Greek: Ἔσδρας Βʹ.

Summary
 Septuagint and its derivative translations:  = 1 Esdras
 King James Version and many successive English translations: 1 Esdras
 Clementine Vulgate and its derivative translations: 3 Esdras
 Slavonic Bible: 2 Esdras
 Ethiopic Bible: Ezra Kali

See also
 Esdras
 2 Esdras
 Deuterocanonical books in Orthodox Christianity
 Septuagint
 Ocidelus

References

External links

 Various translations of 1 Esdras at the World Wide Study Bible
 Catholic Encyclopedia: Esdras: THE BOOKS OF ESDRAS: III Esdras
 Jewish Encyclopedia: Esdras, Books of: I Esdras
  – NRSV
 1 Esdras at Early Jewish Writings
 1 Ezra: 2012 Critical Translation with Audio Drama at biblicalaudio
 

2nd-century BC books
1st-century BC books
1st-century books
Anagignoskomena
Texts in the Septuagint
Jewish apocrypha
Historical books